Göyəbaxan (also, Gëyabakhan and Gyazabakhan) is a village and municipality in the Tovuz Rayon of Azerbaijan.  It has a population of 414.  The municipality consists of the villages of Göyəbaxan, Qarağatlı, Məşədiqulular, Nəsibli, and Hüseynqulular.

References 

Populated places in Tovuz District